Uchenna "Conphidance" Echeazu is a Nigerian American actor, writer, comedian, musician, and producer. He began his entertainment career as a dancer and drummer. He is mostly known for starring and being the face of the Apple TV+ series Little America, a guest star recurring role on Bob Hearts Abishola, playing Okoye in American Gods, a recurring role as Curtis "CJ" Jackson in Complications, and a supporting role in The Sacrament.

Early life 

Conphidance was born and raised in Nigeria. His family later moved to the United States.

Career 

Conphidance played the recurring role of Curtis "CJ" James Thompson in Complications opposite Chris Chalk and Jason O'Mara. Later that year, he was cast in Survivor's Remorse opposite Tichina Arnold, Teyonah Parris, and Erica Ash. He guest-starred in Hidden America with Jonah Ray and played supporting roles in The Inspectors on CBS, Satisfaction on USA Network, and Good Behavior on TNT. He appears as Okoye opposite Orlando Jones in Starz fantasy series American Gods, based on the novel by Neil Gaiman as well as the History Channel's Navy SEAL drama, Six. In films, he played supporting roles in Fist Fight, The Sacrament, and Klippers.

Filmography

Film

Television

References

External links

Living people
Year of birth missing (living people)
Nigerian male television actors
Male actors from Lagos State
Nigerian male film actors
University of Florida alumni
21st-century Nigerian male actors
Igbo actors
Nigerian male musicians
Nigerian film producers
Nigerian comedians